The Somerset Cricket Board (SCB) team competed in List A cricket from 1999 until 2002, taking part in the England and Wales Cricket Board's main knock-out trophy, known as the NatWest Trophy and then Cheltenham & Gloucester Trophy while the SCB played in it. Established as the Gillette Cup in 1963, the knock-out trophy expanded from 32 teams to 60 teams in 1999, featuring all of the minor counties, and the Cricket Board teams from the first-class counties. The Cricket Board teams were considered to be roughly equivalent talent to the minor counties, and they all entered in the first or second round, prior to the first-class counties who entered in the third round. The SCB did not win any of their List A matches, being eliminated in the round they entered in each of the five tournaments they took part in.

Only two players took part in all five of the SCB's List A matches; Kevin Parsons and Mathew Dimond. Parsons captained the SCB in all five matches, and was also the team's highest aggregate run-scorer, accumulating 125 runs for the team, while Dimond took more wickets for the SCB than any other player, claiming six during his matches for the team. Arul Suppiah, who only played for the team once, scored 70 runs in an innings against Cornwall in 2002, the team's highest score. Another player who only appeared once for the side, Matthew Bulbeck, has the best bowling figures for the team, after taking five wickets against Norfolk in 2001. That performance also gives him the best bowling average amongst SCB players, with 3.60. In all, 31 players have appeared for the SCB, of which ten have also made first-class cricket appearances.

Players are initially listed in order of appearance, where players made their debut in the same match, they are ordered by batting order.

Key

List of players

List A captains

See also
 Somerset Cricket Board

References

List A